Paola Musiani (25 November 1949 - 8 January 1985) was an Italian singer.

Life and career 
Born in Vignola, Modena,  at 16 years old, while making her accountancy studies, Musiani started singing  in the dance halls of her region.

In 1966, after taking part in a singing contest with a cover version of The Monkees' "I'm a Believer", she was put under contract by CBS. In 1967 Musiani got her first success with "Ode per Billie Joe", a cover version of  Bobbie Gentry's "Ode to Billie Joe". In the following years she took part to the most important musical events in Italy, including Canzonissima, Cantagiro, Festivalbar and two editions of the Sanremo Music Festival, in 1974 and in 1975.

Musiani later became active on stage as an operetta singer and actress, before dying prematurely, aged 35, because of a car crash in the Autostrada del Sole.

Discography

Album 

     1972: Dedicato a Paola 
     1984: Trapianto (as La Musiani)

Singles  

     1967: La facciata A/Dipingi un mondo per me (CBS, 2727)
     1967: Ode per Billie Joe/Con la tua mamma (CBS, 3027)
     1968: Un ragazzo che sogna/Promesse (CBS, 3513)
     1969: Tu dormirai/Se vuoi cadere in piedi (CBS, 4171)
     1969: Deserto/La principessa non canta più (CBS, 4280)
     1970: Faccia da schiaffi/Cosa vuoi cuore mio (Bentler, BE/NP 5066)
     1971: Noi/Le mie pazza scale (Bentler, BE/NP 5077)
     1971: Il nostro concerto/Adesso che mi manchi tu (Bentler, BE/NP 5079)
     1972: Passerà/La mia strana vita (Bentler, BE/NP 5082)
     1972: Tocco magico/Alone again (Bentler, BE/NP 5086)
     1972: Tu eri il mio bene/Amore immenso (Bentler, BE/NP 5088)
     1973: Tango della gelosia/Davanti a Dio (Bentler, BE/NP 5089)
     1974: La donna quando pensa/L'ultima spiaggia (Bentler, BE/NP-5091)
     1975: Se nasco un’altra volta/Chiaro (Bentler, BE/NP-5099)
     1978: Se/Vieni adesso (Bella Record, ZBN 10002)
     1979: Quello che ci vuole per me/ (Space, ZSB 00102)
     1982: Lassame sta'/E' amare (Effe Proposta, EP-005)
     1983: Fastidio/Curiosità (F1 Team, P 7301)

References

External links 
 
 Paola Musiani at Discogs

People from Vignola
1949 births
1985 deaths
Italian pop singers
Italian musical theatre actresses
Road incident deaths in Italy
20th-century Italian women singers